Pickleweed is a common name used for two unrelated genera of flowering plants:

Batis, family Bataceae
Salicornia, family Amaranthaceae